Neoregelia cruenta is a species of flowering plant in the genus Neoregelia. This species is endemic to Brazil.

Cultivars
 Neoregelia 'BOS'
 Neoregelia 'Carioca'
 Neoregelia 'Dreams'
 Neoregelia 'Elen Zurita'
 Neoregelia 'Goldilocks'
 Neoregelia 'Hilda Ariza'
 Neoregelia 'Iron Maiden'
 Neoregelia 'Karamea Bon Ton'
 Neoregelia 'Karamea Mattino'
 Neoregelia 'Karamea Shadows'
 Neoregelia 'Kitty Ariza'
 Neoregelia 'Laelia'
 Neoregelia 'Mongold'
 Neoregelia 'Natascha'
 Neoregelia 'Noble Descent'
 Neoregelia 'Oso Proud'
 Neoregelia 'Pink Champagne'
 Neoregelia 'Pink Coral'
 Neoregelia 'Red Sport'
 Neoregelia 'Rojoverde'
 Neoregelia 'Rubra'
 Neoregelia 'Sun King'

References

BSI Cultivar Registry Retrieved 11 October 2009

cruenta
Flora of Brazil